Gilbert Eisner is an American former épée fencer.

Eisner is Jewish, and was a commercial artist.

Fencing career
A resident of Kew Gardens Hills, Queens, New York, he fenced for Forest Hills High School in Queens, New York. In 1960, he won the NCAA épée championship while fencing for New York University. He was undefeated in épée in three years at NYU, and graduated in 1961.

He won the épée title at the 1962 U.S. Fencing Championships in New York.  In 1963, he won a gold medal in team épée for the United States at the 1963 Pan American Games.

He is a member of the NYU Athletics Hall of Fame, having been inducted in 1987.

See also
List of USFA Division I National Champions

References

Living people
American male épée fencers
NYU Violets fencers
Year of birth missing (living people)
Place of birth missing (living people)
American artists
Pan American Games medalists in fencing
Pan American Games gold medalists for the United States
Jewish male épée fencers
Jewish American sportspeople
Forest Hills High School (New York) alumni
Fencers at the 1963 Pan American Games
21st-century American Jews
Medalists at the 1963 Pan American Games